Chris Sharpling (born 21 April 1981) is an English former professional footballer who played as a forward in the Football League. He made six league appearances for Crystal Palace in season 1999–2000 in the English second tier before moving into non-league football with Woking in 2001.

References
Footnotes

Sources
Crystal Palace profile at Holmesdale

1981 births
Living people
English footballers
Association football forwards
Footballers from Beckenham
Crystal Palace F.C. players
Woking F.C. players
Walton & Hersham F.C. players
Lewes F.C. players
Kingstonian F.C. players
Bromley F.C. players
Metropolitan Police F.C. players
English Football League players
National League (English football) players